The North Main Street Historic District is a historic district that was listed on the National Register of Historic Places in 1986.

It includes the Southampton (LIRR station), along with North Main Street itself between Railroad Plaza and just south of Suffolk CR 39.

See also
Beach Road Historic District
Southampton Village Historic District
Wickapogue Road Historic District

References

External links
North Main Street Historic District map (Living Places)

Historic districts on the National Register of Historic Places in New York (state)
Historic districts in Suffolk County, New York
Southampton (village), New York
National Register of Historic Places in Suffolk County, New York